Urmila Aryal is a Nepalese politician. She is a member of the Central Committee of the Communist Party of Nepal (Maoist Centre).

Aryal came second in the Parsa-4 seat in the 1994 legislative election with 9288 votes, losing to Nepali Congress candidate Ramesh Rijal. In 1999 legislative election she defeated Rijal, winning the seat with 17095 votes.

In May 2006, she was named Minister for Women, Children and Social Welfare.

Aryal is currently the number four candidate of CPN(UML) in the proportional representation list for the Constituent Assembly election.

She left CPN-UML to join UCPN-(Maoist) and contested the 2013 Constituent Assembly election from Parsa-5. She lost to Jaya Prakash Tharu of CPN-UML election by coming third with 7340 votes.

She was born in Parsa District, Province No. 2, Nepal.

References

Communist Party of Nepal (Unified Marxist–Leninist) politicians
Government ministers of Nepal
Living people
Women government ministers of Nepal
20th-century Nepalese women politicians
20th-century Nepalese politicians
21st-century Nepalese women politicians
21st-century Nepalese politicians
Year of birth missing (living people)
Nepal MPs 1999–2002
People from Parsa District
Khas people
Members of the National Assembly (Nepal)